Footballer of the Year may refer to:

Association football

World
 FIFA World Player of the Year (1991–2009)
 FIFA Ballon d'Or (2010–2015)
 The Best FIFA Men's Player (since 2016)

Other
 African Footballer of the Year
 Asian Footballer of the Year
 Ballon d'Or, or European Footballer of the Year
 Best Footballer in Asia
 CONCACAF Awards, for CONCACAF Player of the Year
 Footballer of the Year (Germany)
 Oceania Footballer of the Year
 South American Footballer of the Year

Gaelic football
 All Stars Footballer of the Year
 GPA Footballer of the Year
 Texaco Footballer of the Year

See also
 :Category:Association football trophies and awards